Ney Sant'Anna Pereira dos Santos is a Brazilian film and television actor. He was born in São Paulo and is the son of Nelson Pereira dos Santos.

Partial filmography
 The Alienist (1970)
 The Amulet of Ogum (1974)
 Joanna Francesa (1975)
 A Árvore dos Sexos (1977)
 Lady on the Bus (1978)
 The Third Bank of the River (1994; producer)

External links

References

1954 births
Living people
Brazilian male film actors
Brazilian male television actors